Mugam is a 1999 Indian Tamil-language film directed by Gnana Rajasekaran. The film stars Nassar and Roja whilst Manivannan, Vivek and Thalaivasal Vijay play supporting roles. It was released on 1 October 1999 and did poorly at the box office.

Plot 

Ranganathan is a deformed man and therefore lives a tough life. He is kicked out of jobs, gets ill-treated constantly, and the girl he loves hates him. Then one day, Rangan goes to the house. With the Mask, Rangan generates followers, becomes a film star, and his new wife Malini loves him solely for his handsome face. Nearing the end, Rangan takes off the Mask for a moment and expects that people would respect him for who he is on the inside. His wife walks in, sees his ugly face, and throws him out, mistaking him for a robber. Rangan's former followers throw him to the side. Deciding that only beauty can bring him respect, Rangan puts the mask back on and lives the life of an actor.

Cast 

Nassar as Rangan
Roja as Malini
Manivannan as Muthannan
Vivek
Thalaivasal Vijay
Vennira Aadai Moorthy
Dhamu
Mayilsamy
Fathima Babu
Ajay Rathnam
Raviraj
Peeli Sivam
Monica
Shobana

Production 
Nassar's appearance in the film was achieved through computer graphics supervised by Trotsky Marudu.

Release and reception 
Vijay Vanniarajan, writing for Indolink, felt that "The storyline would be excellent to read in a novel, but the reality in film is incredibly slow-paced and implausible."  and "that the actors do the best with what they have, but the result is still a very boring long drawn-out masterpiece gone horribly wrong." Aurangzeb of Kalki praised the cinematography, music and art direction but was critical of the film as it fails to connect.

The film did poorly at the box office and was played on television within a month of release. Post-release, Nassar mentioned that the role had seemed interesting when it was first narrated to him, but as the project progressed he lost interest and just followed the director's instructions.

References

External links 

1990s Tamil-language films
1999 films
Films directed by Gnana Rajasekaran
Films scored by Ilaiyaraaja